The bantamweight boxing competition at the 2004 Summer Olympics in Athens was held from 17 to 29 August at Peristeri Olympic Boxing Hall. This is limited to those boxers weighing between 51 and 54 kilograms.

Competition format
Like all Olympic boxing events, the competition was a straight single-elimination tournament. This event consisted of 27 boxers who have qualified for the competition through various tournaments held in 2003 and 2004. The competition began with a preliminary round on 17 August, where the number of competitors was reduced to 16, and concluded with the final on 29 August. As there were fewer than 32 boxers in the competition, a number of boxers received a bye through the preliminary round. Both semi-final losers were awarded bronze medals.

Schedule 
All times are Greece Standard Time (UTC+2)

Qualifying Athletes

Results

Notes
 David Munyasia (Kenya) was ejected from the 2004 Athens Games four days before the draw after he tested positive for cathine.
 Petit Ngnitedem (Gabon) replaced Mohamed Abdelsayed (Egypt) at the last moment winner for the second African qualification.

References

External links
 Official Olympic Report

Bantam